Mahmoud Larnaout (1945-December 25, 2012) was a Tunisian comedic actor.

Biography 
Born in Tunis, Larnaout was an actor and playwright. A native of the Bab Souika district of Tunis, he began in the theatre in school and university troupes. Having joined Taoufik Jebali's El Teatro troupe, he performed roles in plays such as Present by proxy, The Plank of Miracles, Al-Ghoul, as well as Klem Ellil and Fhemt Ella by Taoufik Jebali. He was part of the first generation of the school of youth theatre with, among others, Raouf Basti, Raouf Ben Amor, and Raja Farhat. He also starred in various films - including Making of by Nouri Bouzid and television series, including Dar Lekhlaa and Njoum Ellil.

Larnaout was the director of the Le Mondial cinema in Tunis, and in this capacity was several times a member of the organizing committee of the Carthage Film Festival.

Alongside his theatre and film activities, he also worked as a teacher and then as a banker.

He died in Tunis in 2012.

Filmography
 2006 : Making Of by Nouri Bouzid
 2011 : Black Gold by Jean-Jacques Annaud
 2011 : The Masseur (2011 film)|The Masseur by Anouar Lahouar

References

External links 

 

1985 births
2012 deaths
Tunisian male film actors
Tunisian male stage actors
Tunisian male television actors
People from Tunis